Radio Tamazuj is an independent daily news service in South Sudan and Sudan.

Background 
Radio Tamazuj is also a current affairs broadcaster covering South Sudan, the southern states of Sudan, and the borderlands between the two countries since 2011.

Origin 
The word "Tamazuj" has been translated from South Sudanese Arabic word which means ‘blend’ in Arabic.

Community engagement 
Radio Tamzuj has been sourced for being one of the news analyzers by the Relief Web to provide information for public consumption and thus has been feeding the public on information for both local and international linkages. Radio Tamazuj operates on shortwave during morning and evening time slots only, broadcasting in local dialect Arabic which makes it very easy for the local people to get what is being said which simplifies the message and informs the public. Radio Tamazuj also offers Voice of America--VOA broadcasting that encompasses the daily news from South Sudan in its bulletin.

References 

Radio stations in South Sudan